WTUF (106.3 FM) is a radio station broadcasting a Classic Country format. Licensed to Boston, Georgia, United States, the station serves the Tallahassee area.  The station is currently owned by Boston Radio Company, Inc. and features programming from Jones Radio Network and AP Radio.

History
The station went on the air as WTXR on 1988-03-24.  On 1988-05-20, the station changed its call sign to the current WTUF.

References

External links

TUF
Radio stations established in 1988